Yussuf Lule Ndikumana (born 1 July 1993) is a Burundian professional footballer who plays as a defender for LLB Académic FC in the Burundi Football League.

International career
He was invited by Lofty Naseem, the national team coach, to represent Burundi in the 2014 African Nations Championship held in South Africa.

References

External links

Living people
1993 births
Burundi A' international footballers
2014 African Nations Championship players
Burundian footballers
Burundian Muslims
Association football defenders
Burundi international footballers